The Loch Long One Design is a small wooden sloop rigged keelboat. The design was commissioned by members of Loch Long Sailing Club to mark the 1937 coronation of King George VI and Queen Elizabeth and to replace their existing sailing craft with a low cost design which was capable of safe use in the local conditions found on Loch Long and the Firth of Clyde. The lines of the Swedish Stjärnbåt were adapted by James Croll to add a counter stern, alter construction from clinker to carvel and allow a permanent backstay to be fitted.

Development
In order to keep ownership costs down and preserve the integrity of the Loch Long as a 'one design' class, new technology and ideas have been introduced sparingly and slowly. Although the spinnaker was first flown on the Solent in the 1960s, this somewhat capricious sail was not adopted by the class until 1975. Aluminium alloy masts were experimented with around the same time, but were not adopted for reasons of cost. Sails made of humanmade fibres were experimented with after the Second World War, and were adopted in 1961. Local conditions of strong tides and regular light winds caused sailors on the Forth to adopt a genoa with a larger sail area than the original jib. In the 1990s, a battened jib with an increased sail area was developed to enhance sail durability and performance. New Loch Longs with strip planked hulls were admitted to the class in 1994; 5 boats have been constructed using this method so far, which is significantly cheaper to build than the original carvel construction.

Miscellany
 The first five Loch Longs cost just £66 each, compared to £300 for a Dragon OD (May 1937).
 Luxury items – Minx, No 10, built in 1938, was banned from racing until 1946. Built by Colquhoun for James Croll, her cost was twice that of a standard LLOD and she was considered a ‘luxury’ version, with a significantly lighter hull and heavier keel.
 The price for a new one has risen with inflation and the rise in the cost of labour and materials; by 1949 the cost had risen to £425, and to £495 by 1963. The first strip-plank Loch Long, No.136 Viva built in 1993, cost £15,000.
 Loch Long number 8 Ripple appeared in the 1949 film Floodtide.
 Loch Long number 6 Sirocco was hit by a malfunctioning torpedo on 3 July 1957.
 Out of more than 130 built, over 100 are believed to still exist.

Geographic Spread
There are active racing fleets at Cove Sailing Club on the Clyde and Aldeburgh Yacht Club on the River Alde. In the past there have been fleets at Gourock, Tighnabruaich, Fairlie and Largs on the Clyde, and Granton on the Firth of Forth. A few Loch Longs have escaped the straitjacket of racing and may be found elsewhere. They have been seen as far afield as Kyle of Lochalsh, Falmouth and even across the Atlantic; at least one was exported to the US, and another was transported to Brazil by the artist Simon Starling and features as a piece of installation art.

Builders

 Aldeburgh Boatyard

Builders no longer trading
 Alexander Robertson & Sons
 William Boag of Largs
 James Colquhoun & Sons of Dunoon
 Robert Shaw of Cove
 Nunn Bros. of Woodbridge, Suffolk
 Bute Slip Dock Co. of Bute
 J. Rodger of Glasgow
 D. Munroe & Sons of Gairletter
 C. Whisstock of Woodbridge, Suffolk
 Fairlie Yacht Slip of Fairlie
 McKellar's Slipway of Kilcreggan

References 
 Wishart. R & McMurtrie. J (1987). "Loch Longs; the first fifty years..", Orr Pollock Co. Ltd. 
 Jamie Bruce Lockhart. "Loch Longs: The Third Quarter-Century 1987-2011" Peridot Press 
Article on Loch Long championship 2008, Jamie Bruce-Lockhart
Article on Loch Long championship 2003, Jamie Bruce-Lockhart
 September 1988 and September 1989 editions of 'Yachts and Yachting' magazine
 Wilkes, James 2/11/2005 'Bottoms Up: Turner Prize 2005' Studio International
 Art Tattler article on the art of Simon Starling

Links 
List of keelboat classes designed before 1970

External links 
 Cove Sailing Club (facebook.com)
 Royal Gourock Yacht Club
 Aldeburgh Yacht Club
 'The Mahogany Pavilion (Mobile Architecture no.1)' (2004) in Brazil
 Yachts & Yachting magazine

Keelboats
1930s sailboat type designs
One-design sailing classes